Howard Calvin Bratton (February 4, 1922 – May 5, 2002) was an American lawyer and jurist who served as a United States district judge of the United States District Court for the District of New Mexico.

Early life and education
Bratton was born in Clovis, New Mexico, the son of politician and jurist Sam G. Bratton. He and graduated from New Mexico Military Institute and received a Bachelor of Arts degree from the University of New Mexico in 1941. Bratton served in the United States Army during World War II from 1942 to 1945 and attained the rank of captain. After the war, he received a Bachelor of Laws from Yale Law School in 1947.

Career 
After spending a year as a law clerk for the United States Court of Appeals in 1948, he worked in private practice in Albuquerque, New Mexico, from 1949 to 1952. He was also a special assistant United States attorney in charge of litigation at the Office of Price Stabilization from 1951 to 1952. He returned to private practice in Roswell, New Mexico, from 1952 to 1964. In 1958, Bratton testified before the United States Senate Committee on Interior and Insular Affairs on behalf of the New Mexico Oil & Gas Association.

On March 3, 1964, Bratton was nominated by President Lyndon B. Johnson to a seat on the United States District Court for the District of New Mexico vacated by Judge Waldo Henry Rogers. Bratton was confirmed by the United States Senate on March 14, 1964, and received his commission on March 17, 1964. He served as Chief Judge from 1978 to 1987, assuming senior status on February 4, 1987. Bratton served in that capacity until his death on May 5, 2002.

References

Sources
 

1922 births
2002 deaths
Judges of the United States District Court for the District of New Mexico
United States district court judges appointed by Lyndon B. Johnson
20th-century American judges
United States Army officers
University of New Mexico alumni
Yale Law School alumni
Assistant United States Attorneys
People from Clovis, New Mexico
New Mexico Military Institute alumni
United States Army personnel of World War II